Light Years, published in 1975, is the fourth novel by American writer James Salter.

Plot summary 
Viri and Nedra live with their children, Franca and Danny in an idyllic existence in the countryside. Viri works as an architect in the city, and the couple enjoy hosting dinner for a variety of friends. The first set of friends while leaving the house after dinner with the couple are divided in their opinion of the pair, with Peter admiring their semi-bohemian lifestyle, and Catherine sees Nedra as selfish. Around this same time, the family misplace their new pet tortoise.

While on the outside it seems like family have the perfect life, both Viri and Nedra conduct affairs, and imagine themselves travelling to Europe and expanding their circle of friends.

Nedra's father falls ill and dies, with his daughter travelling back to her small home town to say goodbye shortly before his death, and to clear out his belongings and sell his house. Nedra vows to herself to never return to this town.

With their children now teenagers, and young adults, the pair finally travel to England. Though appearing content, Nedra indicates that things will change for the couple when they return from their holiday.

The following year the couple divorce, and Nedra leaves again for Europe, having a number of encounters with other single men. Viri is left stunned, remaining in the house with his children that have started to make lives of their own.

Nedra returns to the United States for Danny's wedding, taking a flat in the city and trying to enter the arts world, encountering a disciplined theatre troupe that she tries to join, and is rejected for being too old. She continues to conduct affairs.

Peter falls ill with a rare terminal illness, bringing both Viri and Nedra to see Peter and Catherine more frequently before he finally dies.

Both in their late forties, both reflect on their lives, separately concluding that the biggest confirmation of their identity and that they have made their mark, are their children.

To everyone's surprise, Viri sells the house.

Nedra dies in the same manner as her father. After her funeral, Viri travels back to where the house was and in the field adjoining, finds the tortoise lost so long previously, still alive. He comes to understand his place in his life, and feels ready to face the rest of his life.

Characters 
 Viri - an architect, married to Nedra.
 Nedra - married to Viri. Her character often feel like she has somehow missed out, and is always in search for more.
 Franca - eldest daughter of Viri and Nedra.
 Danny (Karen) - youngest daughter of Viri and Nedra.
 Jivan - younger man with whom Nedra conducts and affair.
 Peter and Catherine - couple who dine with Viri and Nedra at intermittent points of the story. Catherine is dubious about Nedra's motivations and behaviour. 
 Eva - a counterpoint character to Nedra, who is divorced and independent, but treated in some ways like an outlier.

Reception 
Although the novel received mixed reviews when it was released, Salter's novel is now highly regarded, with his work revived after his death in 2015.

References 

1975 books